Stinnett is a city in and the county seat of Hutchinson County, Texas, United States. The population was 1,881 at the 2010 census, a decrease from 1,936 at the 2000 census.

History
Stinnett was established in 1926 by A.P. (Ace) Borger, better known as the founder of Borger, a larger community in the county, and his brother Lester Andrew (Pete) Borger. In September 1926, Stinnett replaced Plemons, which later became a ghost town, as the Hutchinson County seat. The courthouse, built in 1927 in the Spanish Renaissance style, was financed from petroleum money. The structure, designed by the architect W.F. Townes, consists of brown brick and cut white stone.

Geography

Stinnett is located at  (35.826231, –101.443617).

Climate

According to the Köppen climate classification system, Stinnett has a semiarid climate, BSk on climate maps.

Demographics

2020 census

As of the 2020 United States census, there were 1,650 people, 521 households, and 367 families residing in the city.

2000 census
At the 2000 census, 1,936 people, 765 households, and 554 families lived in the city. The 870 housing units averaged . The racial makeup of the city was 91.58% White, 0.26% African American, 1.29% Native American, 0.21% Asian, 3.98% from other races, and 2.69% from two or more races. Hispanics or Latinos of any race were 7.54%.

Of the 765 households, 36.1% had children under the age of 18 living with them, 56.6% were married couples living together, 11.0% had a female householder with no husband present, and 27.5% were not families. About 26.1% of households were one person and 13.2% were one person aged 65 or older. The average household size was 2.49 and the average family size was 2.98.

The age distribution was 27.9% under the age of 18, 7.7% from 18 to 24, 27.1% from 25 to 44, 22.5% from 45 to 64, and 14.7% 65 or older. The median age was 37 years. For every 100 females, there were 101.5 males. For every 100 females age 18 and over, there were 96.8 males. 
The median household income was $33,387 and the median family income  was $42,969. Males had a median income of $35,395 versus $18,750 for females. The per capita income for the city was $16,242. About 7.9% of families and 10.6% of the population were below the poverty line, including 15.4% of those under age 18 and 7.5% of those age 65 or over.

Education
The City of Stinnett is served by the Plemons-Stinnett-Phillips Consolidated Independent School District.  It was a part of the Stinnett Independent School District until July 1, 1987, when it merged into the PSP CISD.

Notable people

 Donny Anderson, former NFL player, though born in Borger,  graduated in 1961 from Stinnett High School. He was named All-American while playing college football at Texas Tech in Lubbock. He went on to play for the NFL's Green Bay Packers.
 Jason Collier, former Chief of Police for Stinnett became viral after it surfaced on Facebook that he was married and dating multiple women with the intent to marry them.
 Miss Frankie Groves - first time a woman played on a high school football team in Texas in November 1947. (Possibly the first woman to have played high school football in the US). She played as a lineman at the age of 16 for Stinnett High School.  Frankie played in eight plays for Stinnett High against Groom, Texas in November 1947. (Soon after the game the Texas Interscholastic League headquartered in Austin passed a rule banning girls from playing football.  This ban held until the Texas Board of Education lifted the ban in 1993.)

References

External links

 City of Stinnett

Cities in Hutchinson County, Texas
County seats in Texas
1926 establishments in Texas